Melody is the name of a residential high-rise completed in May 2016 in the Arts & Entertainment District neighborhood of Miami, Florida, U.S.A. The building rises about  with 36 floors and contains nearly 500 rental units. It is located about one block from the Adrienne Arsht Center/Omni Metromover and Metrobus hub.

See also
 List of tallest buildings in Miami

References

Residential skyscrapers in Miami
2016 establishments in Florida
Residential buildings completed in 2016
Residential condominiums in Miami